The term Persian powder can also refer to a type of dry snow in the Zagros Mountains.

Persian powder is an insecticide powder. It is also known as Persian pellitory and insect powder.

Biological pest control
Persian powder is a green pesticide that has been used for centuries for the biological pest extermination of household insects, garden pests, and agricultural pests. It is used indoors, in gardens and the horticulture industry, and in agriculture. 

It is produced from the powdered flowers of certain species of pyrethrum, plants in the genera Chrysanthemum and Tanacetum. In more recent times it has had formulations with brand names such as Zacherlin.

Synthetic forms
Pyrethroids are synthetic insecticides based on natural pyrethrum (pyrethrins), such as permethrin. 

A common formulation of pyrethrin is in preparations containing the synthetic chemical piperonyl butoxide: this has the effect of enhancing the toxicity to insects and speeding the effects when compared with pyrethrins used alone. These formulations are known as synergized pyrethrins.

See also 
 List of pest-repelling plants
Organic gardening
Organic farming

References 

Pyrethroids
Plant toxin insecticides
Biopesticides
+P
Powders